Sappinia diploidea is a free-living amoeba species.

Background
Sappinia can be found worldwide. It usually occurs in elk and buffalo feces, places where farm animals are known to eat, soil containing rotting plants, and fresh water sources.

Clinical significance
It is capable of causing infectious disease in humans.

Symptoms of Sappinia Infection 
Symptoms of a Sappinia infection include headache, photophobia, nausea or upset stomach, vomiting, blurred vision, and loss of consciousness.
A scan of the one, infected patient’s brain also revealed a 2-centimeter tumor-like mass on the back left section of his brain.

Treatment 
Treatment for the one identified case of Sappinia infection included the removal of a tumor in the brain and a series of drugs given to the patient after surgery. This treatment led to the patient’s full recovery.

References

External links
 Centers for Disease Control and Prevention (CDC) Sappinia FAQs
 http://starcentral.mbl.edu/mv/portal.php?pagetitle=classification&BLOCKID=9&CHILDID=13432
 https://www.uniprot.org/taxonomy/343529

Discosea